In geometry, the rhombitriheptagonal tiling is a semiregular tiling of the 
hyperbolic plane. At each vertex of the tiling there is one triangle and one heptagon, alternating between two squares. The tiling has Schläfli symbol rr{7, 3}.  It can be seen as constructed as a rectified triheptagonal tiling, r{7,3}, as well as an expanded heptagonal tiling or expanded order-7 triangular tiling.

Dual tiling 

The dual tiling is called a deltoidal triheptagonal tiling, and consists of congruent kites. It is formed by overlaying an order-3 heptagonal tiling and an order-7 triangular tiling.

Related polyhedra and tilings 

From a Wythoff construction there are eight hyperbolic uniform tilings that can be based from the regular heptagonal tiling. 

Drawing the tiles colored as red on the original faces, yellow at the original vertices, and blue along the original edges, there are 8 forms.

Symmetry mutations
This tiling is topologically related as a part of sequence of cantellated polyhedra with vertex figure (3.4.n.4), and continues as tilings of the hyperbolic plane. These vertex-transitive figures have (*n32) reflectional symmetry.

See also 

 Rhombitrihexagonal tiling
 Order-3 heptagonal tiling
 Tilings of regular polygons
 List of uniform tilings
 Kagome lattice

References
 John H. Conway, Heidi Burgiel, Chaim Goodman-Strass, The Symmetries of Things 2008,  (Chapter 19, The Hyperbolic Archimedean Tessellations)

External links 

 Hyperbolic and Spherical Tiling Gallery
 KaleidoTile 3: Educational software to create spherical, planar and hyperbolic tilings
 Hyperbolic Planar Tessellations, Don Hatch

Hyperbolic tilings
Isogonal tilings
Semiregular tilings